The Turing Test is a BBC Books original novel written by Paul Leonard and based on the long-running British science fiction television series Doctor Who. It features the Eighth Doctor.

The story is in three parts, written as if by three historical figures: mathematician Alan Turing and novelists Graham Greene and Joseph Heller respectively.

External links
The Cloister Library - The Turing Test

2000 British novels
2000 science fiction novels
Eighth Doctor Adventures
Novels by Paul Leonard
Fiction about amnesia
Cultural depictions of Alan Turing